Steven Jackson (born 1983) is an American former football player who was a running back for the Atlanta Falcons and St. Louis Rams.

Steven or Stephen Jackson may also refer to:
Steve Jackson (footballer) (1890–1917), English footballer
Stephen Jackson (canoeist) (born 1956), British sprint canoer
Stephen Jackson (scientist) (born 1962), British biologist
Stephen Jackson (musician) (born 1970), American singer-songwriter for the Pietasters
Stephen Jackson (born 1978), basketball player
Steven Jackson (baseball) (born 1982), American pitcher
Steven Jackson (fullback) (born 1984), American football fullback, free agent who played for Minnesota Vikings, Carolina Panthers, Denver Broncos and Kansas City Chiefs
Stephen Jackson (conductor), former director of the BBC Symphony Chorus

See also
Stevan Jackson (born 1970), Australian footballer
Stefon Jackson (born 1985), American basketball player
Steve Jackson (disambiguation)